Sharad Shankar Dighe (1924-2002) was an Indian politician. He was elected to the Lok Sabha from the Bombay North Central as  a member of the Indian National Congress. He was earlier the Speaker of the Maharashtra Legislative Assembly.

References

1924 births
India MPs 1984–1989
India MPs 1991–1996
Marathi politicians
Lok Sabha members from Maharashtra
Indian National Congress politicians
Speakers of the Maharashtra Legislative Assembly
Members of the Maharashtra Legislative Assembly
Politicians from Mumbai
2002 deaths